The Tree That Remembers is a 2002 animated documentary by Iranian filmmaker Masoud Raouf, exploring the lives of former political prisoners like himself who had been active in the democratic movement during the days of the Shah of Iran, only to face imprisonment and torture under the Islamic regime after the 1979 Iranian revolution.

Produced by the National Film Board of Canada, awards for the film included the Silver Award for Best Canadian Documentary at Hot Docs, as well as a Golden Sheaf Award for Best Social Documentary at the Yorkton Film Festival.

References

External links
Film Web site
Watch The Tree That Remembers at NFB.ca

2002 films
Canadian animated documentary films
National Film Board of Canada documentaries
Quebec films
Canadian animated feature films
Documentary films about historical events
Torture in Iran
Documentary films about refugees
Films about Iranian Canadians
Documentary films about Iran
2002 documentary films
Human rights abuses in Iran
Documentary films about human rights
2000s English-language films
2000s Canadian films